Phoebe Keef  (1898–1978) was a field archaeologist and was elected as a Fellow of the Society of Antiquaries of Scotland in 1938. She directed several excavations, including work at East Dean Park and Harting Beacon, both in Sussex.

Biography 
Keef was born in Amritsar in 1898, and her family later moved to England where she went to school. Keef's father died when she was 3 years old. During the First World War, Keef worked for the YMCA and the St John's Ambulance. In 1938 she volunteered at the excavation of Angmering Roman villa. Keef worked at a hospital during the Second World War, but in 1941 was allowed time away from the hospital to join excavations at Angmering. Two years later she took part in The Conference on the Future of Archaeology at the Institute of Archaeology in London, contributing to a discussion on the role of archaeological societies.

Keef directed excavations at the hillfort known as Harting Beacon between 1948 and 1952; the results were largely unpublished aside from a note in The Antiquaries Journal, however, Owen Bedwin later published a summary of the excavations in the Sussex Archaeological Collections based on Keef's notes accessed after her death. Keef ran the West Sussex excavation group. With the group she excavated a Romano-British farmstead near Lambs Lea in Sussex in 1953–54.

Selected publications

References 

British women archaeologists
British archaeologists
Fellows of the Society of Antiquaries of Scotland
20th-century archaeologists
1898 births
1978 deaths
20th-century antiquarians